UN-Energy is an interagency mechanism within the system of the United Nations related to energy. It was created after the 2002 World Summit on Sustainable Development in Johannesburg, and its purpose is to create a coherent approach towards a sustainable energy system especially in developing countries to meet the Millennium Development Goals.

To do this, UN-Energy is reviewing energy-related activities within the UN system and trying to mainstream them into a broader approach. At present, UN-Energy remains a very small UN entity since it does not even reach the programme status.

UN-Energy was established as a subsidiary body of CEB in 2004 to help ensure coherence in the United Nations system’s multi-disciplinary response to the World Summit on Sustainable Development (WSSD) and to promote the effective engagement of non-UN stakeholders in implementing WSSD energy-related decisions.  Its membership consists of senior officials and experts on energy of the commissions, organizations, funds and programmes listed below. Secretariat work is being done by the Department of Economic and Social Affairs (DESA).

Damilola Ogunbiyi, Special Representative of the UN Secretary-General for Sustainable Energy and Achim Steiner, UNDP Administrator, are the co-chairs of UN-Energy.

Members
Food and Agriculture Organization
International Atomic Energy Agency
Global Environment Facility
United Nations International Research and Training Institute for the Advancement of Women
United Nations Conference on Trade and Development
United Nations Department of Economic and Social Affairs
United Nations Development Programme
United Nations Economic and Social Commission for Asia and the Pacific
United Nations Economic and Social Commission for Western Asia
United Nations Economic Commission for Africa
United Nations Economic Commission for Europe
United Nations Economic Commission for Latin America and the Caribbean
United Nations Educational, Scientific and Cultural Organization
United Nations Environment Programme
United Nations Framework Convention on Climate Change
United Nations Human Settlements Programme
United Nations Industrial Development Organization
United Nations System Chief Executives Board Secretariat
World Bank Group
World Health Organization
World Meteorological Organization

External links
UN-Energy Members
UN-Energy website

Energy policy
Organizations established by the United Nations